Anton Matthias Sprickmann (7 September 1749 – 22 November 1833) was a German writer and lawyer.  He was born and died in Münster.

1749 births
1833 deaths

People from Münster
German male writers